Robert Lee Beerbohm (born June 17, 1952) is an American comic book historian and retailer who has been intimately involved with the rise of comics fandom since 1966. Beginning as a teenager in the late 60s, he became a fixture in the growing comic convention scene, while in the 1970s and 1980s he was heavily involved in Bay Area comic book retailing and distribution.

Beerbohm has been a consultant and author detailing the early history of comics in the United States, including rediscovering the first comic book in America, Rodolphe Töpffer's The Adventures of Mr. Obadiah Oldbuck. He has supplied data and visual aids as listed in the acknowledgements of over 200 books on comics and counting.

Early life
Beerbohm attended the University of Nebraska–Lincoln from 1970 – 1972.

Career

Robert Beerbohm Comic Art 
In October 1966, while still in junior high school, Beerbohm took out his first ad in Rocket's Blast Comicollector (a.k.a. RBCC) #47, launching what has eventually become known as Robert Beerbohm Comic Art. By the 21st century Beerbohm was selling vintage American popular culture artifacts (mostly comic books) via the internet. In addition to setting up at shows nationwide for decades. 

Beerbohm set up a booth at his first comics convention June 16–18, 1967, at the first Houstoncon. Traveling 28 hours on a Greyhound bus, Beerbohm turned 15 the first day of that seminal show.

Beerbohm estimated from June 1967 thru April 2012 he set up at a thousand comics shows. Two strokes saw him close it all down July 10, 2018.

Comics and Comix 

In late August 1972, ten days following the first El Cortez Hotel San Diego Comicon, with housemate Bud Plant and John Barrett, Beerbohm co-opened Comics & Comix on Telegraph Avenue in Berkeley, California.

In April 1973 Comics & Comix hosted the first Bay Area comics convention, Berkeleycon 73, in the Pauley Ballroom in the ASUC Building on the University of California, Berkeley campus. Berkeleycon was the first comic-con that highlighted underground comix.

During the Berkeleycon they were blessed with what became known as the Tom Reilly 'pedigree' collection of close to 4000 white-paper, never-opened NM/M comic books published summer 1939 thru summer 1945. Tom had enlisted in the Navy late Dec 1941. His parents in affluent Piedmont section of Oakland, Calif kept buying one of each. Placing them untouched on shelves in their son's bedroom. Tom is killed during a kamikaze attack in the Pacific summer 1945. His parents sealed the room. They died Dec 1972. The young men ended up with 7/9s of the collection April-June 1972. Within 3 months they had opened 3 more stores dubbing the corporate firm Comics & Comix.

Beerbohm, John Barrett and Bud Plant as Comics & Comix published the first three issues of Jack Katz' The First Kingdom beginning in 1974. They also published comics by Jim Pinkoski and Dan O'Neill during Beerbohm's involvement.

Best of Two Worlds  
Beerbohm sold out in early 1975. He went 'solo' opening his first Best of Two Worlds early Nov 1976 at 1707 Haight St, San Francisco. By May 1977 he opened a 2nd Best of Two Worlds on Telegraph Ave near UC-Berkeley taking over his ex-partner's old location a block apart

On Oct 4, 1978, with partner Gary Wood he opened The Funny Pages on Pier 30, the first high traffic tourist location comic bookstore in America. San Francisco's Fisherman's Wharf was then the 3rd largest tourist attraction in the world. This location sold high end popular culture artifacts to the well-to-do then coming in from all over the world.

In 1980 Beerbohm opened a 3rd Best of Two Worlds on 4th St in Santa Rosa. Charles "Sparky" Schultz then owned a Snoopy skating rink a mile away.

In 1982 Gary Wood sold his 50% to Robert Borden. In early 1985 Borden and Beerbohm sold 14% to Rory Root.

In Feb 1986 massive tsunami-like snow-melt flood waters cascaded out of the Sierra Nevada mountains destroying much of northern California. Best of Two Worlds central warehouse was mostly destroyed. It contained a million comic books, half a million cards, 10,000 concert posters, 3000 pages of original comic book art. Plus 90% of Beerbohm's comics fandom archives 1966-1985.

Best Comics 
After Best of Two Worlds was forced by natural disaster into bankruptcy. Beerbohm went solo again with one store in Haight Ashbury, but moved to better location at Masonic which is a major bus transfer hub for 7 lines on all four corners. Here Beerbohm rebuilt almost from scratch once again. Dec 1987 he hosted Bill Sienkiewicz which boosted the morale of both. In early 1988 Rick Griffin moved to a couple blocks away. Their friendship began to grow.

Best Comics and Rock Art Gallery 
On June 1, 1991, Beerbohm, with silent-partner Edward Walker, opened Best Comics and Rock Art Gallery, an art gallery initially centering on seminal rock poster illustrator Rick Griffin in Fisherman's Wharf at The Cannery. The store's grand opening party June 1, 1991, featured bands like Big Brother and The Holding Company, New Riders of the Purple Sage, members of Quicksilver Messenger Service, It's a Beautiful Day, the Irish band Phoenix, and others. 

All the other concert poster artists wanted in on this then-growing enterprise. Rick and Robert had decided on building the concept larger into a full-fledged Rock Art Museum. Bill Graham of Bill Graham Presents as well as Jann Wenner, publisher of Rolling Stone, were backing this expansion.Two and a half months later, Griffin was killed in a motorcycle accident; Beerbohm and Walker were forced to close the gallery in 1992.

Historian 
As a comics historian, Beerbohm rediscovered the first comic book in America, Rodolphe Töpffer's The Adventures of Mr. Obadiah Oldbuck, published on September 14, 1842 in New York City, as Brother Jonathan Extra No. IX, which is in the same format as a "modern" day comic book, sans staples, which had not yet been invented.

Personal life 
In June 2006 Beerbohm's hip joints imploded going bone on bone on him. In Oct HMO Aetna canceled long paid on medical insurance creating havoc in his business life. Already scheduled surgery was abruptly canceled citing "undisclosed pre-existing condition". Three years went by until Oct 2009 arrangements were finally made which necessitated dual replacements on the same day. Beerbohm riding 'shotgun' took the full-force brunt of a van accident Bud Plant was driving. Terry Stroud, and Dick Swan were aldo involved in this accident in June 1973 coming out of the Houstoncon.

Bibliography 
 "The Big Bang Theory of Comic Book History" (Comic Book Marketplace, 1997)
 "The Mainline Comics Story: An Initial Examination" (Jack Kirby Collector #25, 1998)
 "Secret Origins of the Direct Market Part One: 'Affidavit Returns' - The Scourge of Distribution" (Comic Book Artist #6, Oct. 1999)
 "Secret Origins of the Direct Market Part Two: Phil Seuling and the Undergrounds Emerge," (Comic Book Artist #7, Mar. 2000)
 "The Illustrated Books of Frank King" (Comic Art #1, 2001)
 "Topffer in America" (Comic Art #3, 2003) (with Doug Wheeler and Leonardo De Sa)
 "The American Comic Book: 1929-Present: The Modern Comics Magazine Supplants the Earlier Formats" (Overstreet Comic Book Price Guide #27, 1997 thru 49, 2019) (with Richard Olson, PhD) — Three articles grew in size and scope which were continuously expanded and revised every year by the authors covering a "Victorian Age" (1842-1890s), a "Platinum Age" 1890s thru 1934 as well as an in-depth Origin of the Modern Comic Book 1921-1970s which ran thru #40.

References 

1952 births
Living people
Comics retailers
American archivists
University of Nebraska–Lincoln alumni
California State University, East Bay alumni
Businesspeople from the San Francisco Bay Area